The Mingyi River is a tributary of the Tanglang River in Yunnan province, southwestern China.  The river rises in southwestern Jinning County and the upper stream is called the Chemu River . Another stream rises in the far south of Anning City. These two streams flow together near Bajie, and from there the Mingyi flows north through southern Anning City into Tanglang River. The total length of the Mingyi is 77 km.

Notes

Rivers of Yunnan
Geography of Kunming